Ago was the Duke of Friuli from between 651 and 661 until about 663 (some sources put it as early as 660). He succeeded Grasulf II.

According to Paul the Deacon, there was a house in Cividale named "Ago's House" after this duke. Ago died and was succeeded by Lupus.

References

Further reading
Paul the Deacon. Historia Langobardorum. Translated by William Dudley Foulke. University of Pennsylvania: 1907.
Hartmann, Ludo Moritz. Geschichte Italiens im Mittelalter. Gotha, 1903.
Hodgkin, Thomas. Italy and her Invaders. Clarendon Press: 1895.

Year of birth missing
663 deaths
Dukes of Friuli
7th-century Lombard people
7th-century rulers in Europe